The Corps may refer to:

Organizations
 The Corps (song), a traditional hymn of the United States Military Academy
 Texas A&M University Corps of Cadets, a student military organization at Texas A&M University
 Corps of Cadets, the collective student body of the United States Military Academy at West Point

Fiction and literature
 The Corps (comics), armies in the 2000 AD and Judge Dredd comic series
 Captain Britain Corps, a league of Marvel Comics super-heroes
 The Corps Series, a fictional series of books on the U.S. Marine Corps by W. E. B. Griffin

See also 
 Corps, a military formation or grouping
 The Corp, a student organization at Georgetown University
 Corps (disambiguation)